Žan Kranjec (born 15 November 1992) is a World Cup alpine ski racer from Slovenia, and primarily competes in the technical events of giant slalom and slalom. At the 2022 Winter Olympics, Kranjec won a silver medal in the giant slalom.

Career
Kranjec made his World Cup debut at age 18 in March 2011 at Kranjska Gora. He represented Slovenia at the World Championships in 2013 and was 22nd in giant slalom. A week later at the Junior World Championships in Canada, he won a bronze medal in giant slalom.

At the 2018 Winter Olympics, Kranjec placed fourth in the giant slalom. In December 2018, he gained his first World Cup win in Saalbach,  As of 2022, Kranjec has two World Cup wins and seven podiums in total.

At the 2022 Winter Olympics, Kranjec was eighth after the first run of the giant slalom, then was the fastest in the second run to win the silver medal, runner-up to Marco Odermatt.

World Cup results

Season standings

Race podiums
 2 wins – (2 GS)
 11 podiums – (11 GS), 36 top tens

World Championship results

Olympic results

References

External links

 
 
 
  

1992 births
Living people
Skiers from Ljubljana
Slovenian male alpine skiers
Alpine skiers at the 2014 Winter Olympics
Alpine skiers at the 2018 Winter Olympics
Alpine skiers at the 2022 Winter Olympics
Olympic alpine skiers of Slovenia
Medalists at the 2022 Winter Olympics
Olympic silver medalists for Slovenia
Olympic medalists in alpine skiing